Daisy Lake is a lake in the Arctic Ocean and Great Slave Lake drainage basins in South Slave Region, Northwest Territories, Canada.

It is also just southeast of the McDonald Fault.

The primary inflow is an unnamed creek at the northeast, and the primary outflow is an unnamed creek at the southeast that empties into Dion Lake, whose waters in turn flow via Robert Lake and the Snowdrift River to Great Slave Lake at the community of Lutselk'e.

References

Lakes of the Northwest Territories